Gnathothlibus fijiensis is a moth of the  family Sphingidae. It is known from Fiji.

The length of the forewings is 38–41 mm for males and 40-44 for females. It is similar to Gnathothlibus eras, Gnathothlibus saccoi and Gnathothlibus vanuatuensis but distinguishable by the distinctive olive green ground colour of the forewing upperside and the mauve outer edge to the tegula in the males.

Etymology
The specific name fijiensis is derived from the Pacific island nation of Fiji, the only known locality for the species.

References

Gnathothlibus
Moths described in 2009